Andrea Bocelli  (born 22 September 1958) is an Italian tenor. He was born visually impaired, with congenital glaucoma, and at the age of 12, Bocelli became completely blind, following a brain hemorrhage resulting from a football accident. After performing evenings in piano bars and competing in local singing contests, Bocelli signed his first recording contract with the Sugar Music label. He rose to fame in 1994, winning the newcomer’s section of the 44th Sanremo Music Festival performing "Il mare calmo della sera".

Since 1994, Bocelli has recorded 15 solo studio albums of both pop and classical music, three greatest hits albums, and nine complete operas, selling over 75 million records worldwide. He has had success as a crossover performer, bringing classical music to the top of international pop charts. His album Romanza is one of the best-selling albums of all time, while Sacred Arias is the biggest selling classical album by any solo artist in history. My Christmas was the best-selling holiday album of 2009 and one of the best-selling holiday albums in the United States. The 2019 album Sì debuted at number one on the UK Albums Chart and US Billboard 200, becoming Bocelli's first number-one album in both countries. His song "Con te partirò", included on his second album Bocelli, is one of the best-selling singles of all time. The track was licensed to feature in a series of television commercials for TIM in the late 1990s, which eventually became very popular in Italy.

In 1998, Bocelli was named one of People magazine's 50 Most Beautiful People. He duetted with Celine Dion on the song "The Prayer" for the animated film Quest for Camelot, which won the Golden Globe Award for Best Original Song and was nominated for the Academy Award for Best Original Song. In 1999, he was nominated for Best New Artist at the Grammy Awards. He captured a listing in the Guinness Book of World Records with the release of his classical album Sacred Arias, as he simultaneously held the top three positions on the US Classical Albums charts.

Bocelli was made a Grand Officer of the Order of Merit of the Italian Republic in 2006 and was honored with a star on the Hollywood Walk of Fame on 2 March 2010 for his contribution to Live Theater and he was awarded a gold medal for Merit in Serbia in 2022. Singer Celine Dion has said that "if God would have a singing voice, he must sound a lot like Andrea Bocelli", and record producer David Foster has often described Bocelli's voice as the most beautiful in the world.

Early life
Bocelli was born with impaired sight to Alessandro and Edi Bocelli on 22 September 1958. He was born with congenital glaucoma. He stated that his mother's decision to give birth to him and overrule the doctor's advice was the inspiration for him to oppose abortion.

His mother and younger brother Alberto still live in the family home; his father died in 2000.

Bocelli showed a great passion for music as a young boy. His mother has said that music was the only thing that would comfort him. He started piano lessons at age 6 and later learned to play the flute, saxophone, trumpet, trombone, guitar, and drums. His nanny Oriana gave him the first record of Franco Corelli, and he began to show interest in pursuing the career of a tenor. By age 7, he was able to recognize the famous voices of the time and tried to emulate the great singers.

At age 12, Bocelli lost his vision completely due to a football accident. He was hit in the eye playing goalkeeper during a match and experienced a brain hemorrhage. Doctors resorted to leeches in a last-ditch effort to save his sight, but they were unsuccessful and he remained blind.

Bocelli also spent time singing during his childhood. He gave his first concert in a small village not far from where he was born. He won his first song competition at age 14 with "'O sole mio" at the Margherita d'Oro in Viareggio. He finished secondary school in 1980, and then studied law at the University of Pisa. To earn money, he performed evenings in piano bars, and it was there that he met his future wife Enrica in 1987. He completed law school and spent one year as a court-appointed lawyer.

Career

1992–1994: Sanremo and Il mare calmo della sera
In 1992, Italian rock star Zucchero held auditions for tenors to make a demo tape of his song "Miserere", to send to Italian tenor Luciano Pavarotti. After hearing Bocelli on tape, Pavarotti urged Zucchero to use Bocelli instead of him. Zucchero eventually persuaded Pavarotti to record the song with Bocelli, and it became a hit throughout Europe. In Zucchero's European concert tour in 1993, Bocelli accompanied him to sing the duet, and he was also given solo sets in the concerts, singing "Nessun dorma" from Giacomo Puccini's opera Turandot. Bocelli signed with the Sugar Music label in Milan after Caterina Caselli heard Bocelli sing "Miserere" and "Nessun Dorma" at a birthday party for Zucchero.

In December, Bocelli entered the preliminary round of the Sanremo Music Festival in the category of Giovani, performing "Miserere". He won the preliminary competition with the highest marks ever recorded in the newcomers section. On 28 December, he debuted in the classical world in a concert at the Teatro Romolo Valli in Reggio Emilia. In February 1994, he entered the main Sanremo Festival competition with "Il mare calmo della sera", and he won the newcomers section, again with a record score. Following his win, Bocelli released his debut album of the same name in April, and it entered the Italian Top Ten, being certified platinum within weeks.

In May 1994, he toured with pop singer Gerardina Trovato. In September, he sang at Pavarotti's annual Charity Gala concert, Pavarotti International in Modena, where he sang Ruggiero Leoncavallo's "Mattinata" and sang a duet with Pavarotti, Maurizio Morante's "Notte e Piscatore". In September, he made his opera debut as Macduff in Verdi's Macbeth at the Teatro Verdi in Pisa. Bocelli had been an agnostic, but around 1994, partly as a result of immersing himself in the works of Russian author Leo Tolstoy, he returned to the practice of the Catholic faith. He performed the hymn "Adeste Fideles" in Rome before Pope John Paul II in St. Peter's Basilica at Christmas.

1995–1997: Bocelli and Romanza
As winner of the newcomers section at the 1994 Sanremo Festival, Bocelli was invited to return the following year. He entered the main competition with "Con te partirò" and finished in fourth place. The song was included on his second album, Bocelli, produced by Mauro Malavasi and released in November 1995. In Belgium, "Con te partirò" became the best-selling single of all time.

His third album, Viaggio Italiano, was released in Italy in 1996. He was invited to sing a duet with English soprano Sarah Brightman at the final bout of German boxer Henry Maske. Brightman approached Bocelli after she heard him singing "Con te partirò" while she was dining in a restaurant. Changing the title lyric of the song to "Time to Say Goodbye", they re-recorded it as a duet with members of the London Symphony Orchestra and sang it as a farewell for Maske. The single debuted atop the German charts, where it stayed for fourteen weeks. With sales nearing three million copies, and a sextuple platinum award, "Time to Say Goodbye" eclipsed the previous best-selling single by more than one million copies. He topped the Spanish singles chart in 1996 with a duet with Marta Sánchez, "Vivo por ella", the Spanish version of "Vivo per lei", recorded with Giorgia for his 1997 compilation album, Romanza. He also recorded a Portuguese version of the song with Brazilian singer Sandy.

The same year, Bocelli recorded "Je vis pour elle", the French version of "Vivo per lei", as a duet with French singer Hélène Ségara. Released in December 1997, the song became a hit in Belgium (Wallonia) and France, where it reached No. 1 on the charts. To date, it is the best-selling single for Ségara, and the second for Bocelli after "Time to Say Goodbye". On 3 March, he appeared in Hamburg, Germany, with Sarah Brightman to receive the ECHO music award for "Best Single of the Year".

In the summer of 1997, he gave 22 open-air concerts in Germany, and an indoor concert in Oberhausen on 31 August. In September, he performed in concert at the Piazza dei Cavalieri in Pisa for the home video A Night in Tuscany with guests Nuccia Focile, Sarah Brightman and Zucchero. The concert was also Bocelli's first concert to air on PBS part of the In The Spotlight series. It also marked as Bocelli's debut to the American audiences. On 14 September, in Munich, Germany, he received an ECHO Klassik Best Seller of the Year award for his album, Viaggio Italiano.

Back in Italy in Bologna on 27 September, he sang at the International Eucharistic Congress. On 19 October, he sang at the TeleFood benefit concert held in the Vatican City to raise awareness about world hunger. On 25 October, he received a Bambi Award in the Klassik category in Cologne, Germany.

1998–1999: Aria: The Opera Album, Sogno and Sacred Arias
Bocelli made his debut in a major operatic role in 1998 when he played Rodolfo in a production of La bohème at the Teatro Comunale in Cagliari from 18 to 25 February. His fifth album Aria: The Opera Album was released in March.

On 19 April, Bocelli made his United States debut with a concert at the John F. Kennedy Center for the Performing Arts in Washington, D.C., followed the next day by a reception at the White House with then US President Bill Clinton. On 5 May, he appeared in Monte Carlo, winning two World Music Awards, one in the category "Best Italian Singer", and one for "Best Classical Interpretation". He was also named one of People magazine's 50 Most Beautiful People of 1998.

From June to August, he toured North and South America. In September, he received his second Echo Klassik award, this time for Best Selling Classical Album with Aria: The Opera Album. On Thanksgiving Eve, Bocelli was a guest on Céline Dion's television special These Are Special Times in which he joined Dion to sing "The Prayer" and he also sang "Ave Maria" solo. The duet was included on Dion's album These Are Special Times (1998) and was re-issued with the DVD of the TV special in 2007. The song also appeared on the Quest for Camelot soundtrack in 1998 and on Bocelli's album, Sogno, the following year.

In the New Year, he performed two concerts at the Bellagio hotel in Las Vegas. At the 56th Golden Globe Awards held on 24 January, "The Prayer" won the Golden Globe Award for Best Original Song from the film Quest for Camelot. At the 41st Grammy Awards ceremony on 24 February, Bocelli was nominated for Best New Artist, which was won by Lauryn Hill. Bocelli and Dion sang "The Prayer" at the ceremony. The song was also nominated for an Academy Award for Best Original Song and performed by Bocelli and Dion at the ceremony held at the Los Angeles Music Center on 21 March.

From 11 to 24 April, he toured the West Coast of North America, from San Diego to Vancouver, with a final performance at the Hollywood Bowl in Los Angeles. Actress Elizabeth Taylor stood by his side on the stage during the encore, while he sang "The Prayer". At the invitation of Steven Spielberg, Bocelli sang in Los Angeles on 15 May before Bill Clinton at an event on behalf of the Democratic Party. At the end of May, he toured Portugal and Spain and sang with Portuguese Fado singer Dulce Pontes. On 27 June, he took part in the Michael Jackson benefit concert for suffering children in Munich's Olympic Stadium.

From 10 July to 27 August, he appeared in a guest role for seven performances of The Merry Widow at the Verona Arena. As the "Tenor Conte Andrea" he performed three arias: "La donna è mobile" from Verdi's Rigoletto; "Tu, che m' hai preso il cuor" from Franz Lehár's Das Land Des Laechelns and "Libiamo ne' lieti calici" from Verdi's La traviata. On 10 September, together with soprano Daniela Dessì and two Polish singers, he performed at the Great Theatre of Łódź in Poland. From 7 October to 19 November, he made his United States operatic debut in Jules Massenet's Werther at the Detroit Opera House with the Michigan Opera Theater.

He also performed at Rodeo Drive in Beverly Hills and gave further concerts in Detroit, Cleveland and Chicago, and made an appearance on Jay Leno's first installment of The Tonight Show. Then Mayor of New York City Rudy Giuliani gave him the Crystal Apple award. His seventh album Sacred Arias, which contains exclusively sacred music, was released worldwide on 8 November, and two weeks later reached number one on the US Classic Billboard charts – making Bocelli the first vocalist to hold all top three places on the chart, with Aria, the opera album in second place, and Viaggio Italiano in third place. The album also included the hymn of the Holy Year 2000 which was chosen as the official version by the Vatican in October. To promote Sacred Arias, Bocelli recorded his second PBS concert at the Roman church of Santa Maria sopra Minerva, in Rome, in 1999, singing most of the songs from the album. The special was nominated for an Emmy Award for Outstanding Classical Music-Dance Program during the 52nd Primetime Emmy Awards.

In Italy, Bocelli sang in Florence at a meeting of the centre-left Heads of State. Invited by Queen Elizabeth II, he performed at the annual Royal Variety Performance in Birmingham, UK, on 29 November. On 30 November, his book La musica del silenzio, an autobiographical novel, was released in Italy, and in 2017 it was turned into a movie as The Music of Silence, directed by Michael Radford. From 12 to 21 December, he performed six concerts in Barcelona, Strasbourg, Lisbon, Zagreb, Budapest and Messina, some of which were broadcast on local television. He also performed on German television; Wetten, dass..? on 11 December and the José Carreras Gala in Leipzig on 17 December. On 31 December, he finished a marathon twenty-four concerts in thirty days, with a concert at the Nassau Veterans Memorial Coliseum in New York, welcoming in the new millennium.

2000–2001: Verdi and Cieli di Toscana
At the 42nd Grammy Awards, Bocelli was nominated twice. "The Prayer" was nominated for Best Pop Collaboration with Vocals and for Best Male Pop Vocal Performance. Bocelli performed it with Dion at the ceremony. His "World Tour 2000" started on 31 March. In May, his Sacred Arias album was voted album of the year by listeners of the Classic FM radio station in the UK. His world tour continued from 12 to 14 May with four concerts in Japan and South Korea. At the end of the UEFA European Football Championship, he performed with Valery Gergiev and Renée Fleming at a concert on the River Maas in Rotterdam. On 6 July, he performed at the Statue of Liberty in New York City for his third PBS special American Dream: Andrea Bocelli's Statue Of Liberty Concert. The concert was a dedication to his father, who died in the beginning of 2000. He was accompanied by the New Jersey Symphony Orchestra under the direction of Maestro Steven Mercurio with special guest Soprano Ana Maria Martinez and a surprise appearance by Sarah Brightman to sing with Bocelli on "Time to Say Goodbye". For the final encore, he dedicated "Sogno" to his late Father. On 17 August, he performed in Giuseppe Verdi's Messa da Requiem at the Verona Arena in Rome.

His seventh album, Verdi, was released on 11 September. In September, he performed three concerts in Australia. He received another Echo Klassik award for "Bestseller of the year" for Sacred Arias. In November, his first complete opera recording, La Bohème, was released. In December, he received another award in Germany, the Goldene Europa for classical music.

In January 2001, Bocelli portrayed the main character in Mascagni's opera L'amico Fritz at the Teatro Filarmonico in Verona and again performed the tenor part in Verdi's Requiem. On 19 March, the Requiem album was released with Bocelli as tenor. From 22 March to 6 April, he toured North America accompanied by Cecilia Gasdia and the Hartford Symphony Orchestra. On 17 June, he performed at the re-opening of the Leaning Tower of Pisa. In July, he performed two concerts in Dublin with Ana María Martínez and the New Symphony Orchestra. At the Scuola Grande di San Rocco in Venice on 4 October, he presented his new album Cieli di Toscana and was recognised for having sold more than 40 million albums worldwide. In October, he opened the celebrations of the 200th anniversary of the birth of Sicilian opera composer Vincenzo Bellini in Catania. On 28 October, he sang Franz Schubert's Ellens dritter Gesang (also known as "Ave Maria", Latin for "Hail Mary") as a representative of the Roman Catholic faith, during a memorial concert at Ground Zero in New York City for the victims of the September 11 attacks there. In November, he received the Platinum Europe Award for one million sales of the album Cieli di Toscana, and at the Italian Music Awards he was given a special award from the Federation of the Italian Music Industry for his merits as an "Ambassador of Italian music in the world". He performed seven more concerts in the US accompanied by Ana María Martínez, and on 23 December, he sang the Italian national anthem as well as works of Bellini and Verdi at the traditional Christmas concert in the Italian Senate, which was broadcast live on television for the first time.

2002–2005: Sentimento and Andrea

In Berlin on 5 February, he received a Goldene Kamera award in the "Music & Entertainment" category. On 6 March, he received two World Music Awards in Monte Carlo: "World best selling classical artist" and "Best selling Italian artist". On 11 March, he gave a concert for peace at the Basilica di San Marco a Venezia in Venice, accompanied by the orchestra of the Teatro La Fenice and conducted by Lorin Maazel. On 15 March, he took part in the opening of Walt Disney Studios Park in Marne-la-Vallée France. On 7 May, Bocelli and Tony Renis received a Telegatto Italian Television award for the soundtrack of the series Cuore. On 23 May he received the 2002 Classical BRIT Award for "Outstanding Contribution to Music". On 27 May, he performed at the Villa Madama in Rome in front of US president George W. Bush and Italian president Silvio Berlusconi. On 28 May, he took part in "Pavarotti & Friends" charity concert in Modena in aid of Angola. In June he again toured the US, then on 26 July and 3 August, he portrayed Lieutenant B.F. Pinkerton in Madama Butterfly at the 48th Puccini Festival in Torre del Lago. On 14 October, he and Lorin Maazel presented his new album Sentimento to a worldwide audience. Further presentations took place in Milan and New York, and the album was released on 4 November, selling over two million copies in 40 days. On 24 October, he started his Sentimento tour in Zürich which took in large arenas in several European and North American cities.

In February 2003, Bocelli performed Madama Butterfly in an exclusive Monte Carlo concert, which was attended by Caroline, Princess of Hanover. In March for the first time he appeared as a producer, at the Sanremo Festival, where the young artists Allunati and Jacqueline Ferry sang for his new record label, Clacksong. In May his second complete opera, Tosca, was released. It did not attract unanimous praise, though. Andreas Dorschel notices "monochrome timbre" and "little dynamic variability" in Bocelli's performance: "Whatever is suffered by Cavaradossi − torture for instance or the prospect of execution −: Bocelli does not seem to register it, but goes on in the musical equivalent of Stoic indifference." At a private benefit gala for the Royal National Institute of Blind People, Bocelli sang in front of the British Royal Family. A day later he received two awards for Sentimento at the 2003 Classical BRIT Award held at the Royal Albert Hall in London – "Best selling classical album" and "Album of the year". On 24 May, he performed in a benefit concert for the Arpa Foundation for Film, Music and Art in the Piazza del Campo in Siena, with sopranos Maria Luigia Borsi and Lucia Dessanti, baritone Soo Kyung Ahn, and violinist Ruth Rogers, accompanied by Marcello Rota and the Orchestra Città di Pisa. Three days later he was again invited to perform at "Pavarotti & Friends" in Modena and sang a medley of Neapolitan songs together with Pavarotti. In June, he continued his Sentimento tour in Athens and Cyprus. In September, he took part in a concert for the Justice ministers and Interior ministers of the European Union at the Parco della Musica in Rome. He then resumed his tour, accompanied by Maria Luigia Borsi, Ruth Rogers and Marcello Rota.

Bocelli won the "Favourite Specialist Performer" award at the UK National Music Awards in October 2003. In November he once again toured in the United States, this time accompanied by Ana Maria Martinez, Kallen Esperian and Steven Mercurio. In December he gave his first concert in China and at the end of the month, sang Gounod's Ave Maria at Pavarotti's wedding in Modena.

In Bologna in January, he performed as Werther in four performances of the opera of the same name. In April and May, he toured Asia again, visiting Manila, Hong Kong and Singapore. In May, he took part in a concert at Circo Massimo in Rome organised by Quincy Jones to launch the "We are the Future" project. In June, his third complete opera Il trovatore was released. In July, he played the part of Mario Cavaradossi in Tosca at the 50th Puccini Festival in Torre del Lago, and he took part in the International Olympic Committee (IOC) global campaign for the 2004 Summer Olympics in Athens.

In September, he performed his "Once in a Lifetime" tour in Australia with concerts in Sydney and Melbourne and one concert in Christchurch, New Zealand, where he was joined on stage by New Zealand soprano Hayley Westenra.

On 15 October, he performed at the People Conference Hall in Beijing, China, and on 17 October at the Great Hall in Shanghai.

During early 2005, Bocelli was on tour including performances in Madeira, Hungary, Norway, US, UK, Italy and Germany. He also appeared in Sesame Street singing "Time to Say Goodnight" a parody of "Time to Say Goodbye" as a lullaby to Elmo. On 21 March, he performed at the Music for Asia benefit concert in Rome, televised on Italia 1, in aid of the 2004 Indian Ocean earthquake appeal.

In June, he performed at the Deutsche Opera in Berlin. On 2 July, he performed at the Paris concert as part of the Live 8 event. Also during the second part of the year, he performed in Croatia, Serbia, Italy, the US, Dubai, Switzerland and finally in Scandinavia. On 28 August, he performed at the Faenol Festival held in Vaynol, Wales and organised by Welsh bass-baritone Bryn Terfel. In December, his first contemporary music concert took place at a Lake Las Vegas village resort in Nevada, US, which was recorded for PBS and released as the Under the Desert Sky DVD. He also took part in the Royal Christmas Show, which took place in several cities in the US in December. The album Werther was released in December.

2006–2007: Amore and Vivere, Greatest hits

On 18 February, he sang at the Toyota Center in Houston during the National Basketball Association's (NBA) 2006 All-Star Weekend, and broadcast live on the TNT Cable television network.

On 26 February, Bocelli sang "Because We Believe" from his Amore album in the Carnevale section of the closing ceremony of the Torino Olympics. He also began another tour with a concert at the Piazza di Castello in Turin. In March, he was honoured by the Italian state with a Grande Ufficiale Italian Order of Merit (Grand Officer of the Italian Republic), given to him by then President of the Italian Republic, Carlo Azeglio Ciampi. The award was presented to him at the Sanremo Festival where he performed a duet with American singer Christina Aguilera on 4 March.

From 31 March to 2 April, he took part in the Maggio Musicale in Florence where he sang the Canto di pace (Canto of peace) by Marco Tutino and the tenor part from Gioachino Rossini's Messa di Gloria and in Naples where he took part in Rossini's Petite messe solennelle.

In April 2006, he featured as a guest coach on American Idol helping the finalists sing the week's themed songs, "Greatest Love Songs". He also performed on that week's results show. American Idol runner-up Katharine McPhee performed at three of Bocelli's concerts in California from 9 to 11 June singing duets of Somos Novios and The Prayer with Bocelli. They also performed on J. C. Penney Jam: The Concert for America's Kids and recorded duet versions of Somos Novios for the resulting album, and also Can't Help Falling in Love on the CD of the Under the Desert Sky DVD.

In June, he sang the Italian duet version of "Because We Believe", "Ama, credi e vai", with Gianna Nannini at the "großen Fan Party" at the opening of the 2006 FIFA World Cup, in Berlin in front of billions of worldwide television viewers.

On 1 July 2007, Bocelli performed "The Music of the Night" from Andrew Lloyd Webber's The Phantom of the Opera, in a special musicals medley during the Concert for Diana at Wembley Stadium in London, England. Bocelli returned to his home town for a concert at the newly created Teatro del Silenzio in Lajatico on 5 July 2007, with guest appearance by Kenny G, Heather Headley, Lang Lang, Elisa, Sarah Brightman and Laura Pausini. The concert was later released as Vivere Live in Tuscany. In September, he debuted at the Avery Fisher Hall, in New York, with four concerts. October saw the release of the opera album of Ruggiero Leoncavallo's Pagliacci with Bocelli singing the role of Canio. In November, he won the "Best Italian Artist" and "World's Best-selling Classical Artist" awards at the World Music Awards. In December, he finished his 2006 tour with more concerts in North America and Europe.

Bocelli and Sarah Brightman's duet version of "Con te partirò" was used in the 2007 film Blades of Glory, as an ice skating song. K-1 mixed martial arts fighter Yoshihiro Akiyama started using "Con te partirò" as his ring entrance music. On 8 September, Bocelli sang an arrangement of Mozart's Ave verum corpus at the funeral of Luciano Pavarotti in Modena, Italy.

On 21 October 2007, he sang "Con te partirò" on the UK television series Strictly Come Dancing results show, and on 30 October, he sang "The Prayer" during an ITV Special An Audience with Céline Dion. The show was broadcast on 23 December. Alongside fellow Italian singer Laura Pausini, he sang Vive Ya during the 2007 Latin Grammy Awards. The song, originally released in 1997 as a duet in Italian between Bocelli and Italian singer-songwriter Trovatto on Bocelli's Romanza, was also released in English on his 2007 album, The Best of Andrea Bocelli: Vivere, as Dare to Live. The album, Vivere, sold over 3 million copies.

2008: Incanto and Carmen
On 20 January 2008, Bocelli received the Italian TV award Telegatto in platinum for Italian music in the world, in Rome. He sang "La voce del silenzio" – "The voice of silence" – and "Dare to Live" during the ceremony.

To promote the album, he performed "Canto della Terra" at The Alan Titchmarsh Show on the BBC in London on 1 February; was interviewed by Fabio Fazio on the Italian talk show Che tempo che fa on RAI 3 in Italy; and performed "Canto della terra", "A te" and "Besame mucho" from the album, as well as "My Way" on 2 February; and made an appearance on The South Bank Show in London, where he sang the French aria "Pour mon âme" on 3 February. Then on 10 February, he performed "The Prayer" at the 50th Grammy Awards, held in Los Angeles, with Josh Groban in a tribute to Luciano Pavarotti, and sang "Dare to Live" with Heather Headley the following day on The Tonight Show with Jay Leno.

In April, he toured in Asia with performances in Tokyo, Taichung, and Seoul.

On 7 May 2008, he sang at Steel Aréna in Košice, Slovakia, in front of 8,000 people. Then on 13 May he sang at the "Teatro delle Muse" in Ancona, Italy, for a charity concert for "Francesca Rava – N.P.H. Italia Onlus", a foundation that helps poor and disabled children around the world.

On 23 May 2008, he sang The Prayer with Katharine McPhee in a Las Vegas tribute concert for Canadian producer and songwriter David Foster. Bocelli later praised Filipina teen-aged singer Charice, whom he first heard perform at that concert.

On 2 June 2008, he performed at the Piazza del Duomo, Milan in front of 80,000 people during a concert celebrating the anniversary of the Republic of Italy's formation.

From 17 to 28 June, Bocelli played the role of Don José on stage, opposite Hungarian mezzo-soprano Ildikó Komlósi as Carmen, in Georges Bizet's opera at the Teatro dell'Opera di Roma, in Rome, for four nights. Bocelli released the complete opera recording of Carmen in Italy in the same year, which he recorded in 2005. Myung-whun Chung conducted the Orchestre Philharmonique de Radio France and the Chœur de Radio France for the recording, and Welsh Bass-baritone Bryn Terfel, was part of the Ensemble. The recording was not released internationally, until March 2010. Carmen: Duets & Arias, a single-disc collection of some of the arias and duets of the recording, was also released in 2010.

On 20 July, Bocelli held his third concert at the Teatro del Silenzio in Lajatico, his hometown. The concert was a tribute to the cinema of Italy. Its performers included Italian composer and musician Nicola Piovani, Italian ballet dancer Roberto Bolle, Israeli singer Noa, and Charice. Then on 31 July, he performed at a concert in Vingis Park in Vilnius, Lithuania, in front of more than 18,000 people. Australian singer Tina Arena performed two duets with Bocelli – "Canto Della Terra" and "The Prayer" – at the closing stages of the concert.

On 7 August 2008, he held a benefit concert at Medjugorje, Bosnia Herzegovina, and was accompanied by the Czech National Symphony Orchestra. Then, during the rest of August, he was on tour in Australia and New Zealand for the third time. Tina Arena performed with him in all 5 concerts during the tour.

On 26 September 2008, during the 2008 Veneto Festival, he held a concert in the Church of the Eremitani in Padova, Italy. He was accompanied by the I Solisti Veneti orchestra, celebrating its 50th birthday and conducted by Claudio Scimone, and by the Wiener Singakademie choir. The concert was a celebration of Giacomo Puccini's 150th birthday.

On 10 and 11 October he performed at Petra, singing "Dare to Live" with Laura Pausini, as well as performing "E Lucevan le Stelle" from Tosca. On 19 October, he sang "'O surdato 'nnammurato" and a duet of "Non Ti Scordar Di Me" with Cecilia Bartoli, both from the Incanto album, during the ECHO Awards in Germany; and later presented the soprano with an ECHO award. On 24 October, he performed at Piazza del Plebiscito in Naples, as a tribute to the city, where he celebrated the Italian release of Incanto. Performing with him were flautist Andrea Griminelli, Italian pop singer Massimo Ranieri and soprano Cecilia Bartoli, with Steven Mercurio conducting the Czech National Symphony Orchestra. On 31 October, he performed a solo version of "The Prayer", as well as "Because", a song from Incanto, live on The Oprah Winfrey Show.

On 21 and 22 November Bocelli was amongst a quartet of soloists (soprano Sabina Cvilak, mezzo-soprano Kate Aldrich and bass Alexander Vinogradov) to sing Rossini's Petite messe solennelle, conducted by Plácido Domingo, at the Washington National Opera in Washington, D.C. Bocelli sang twice in the piece and later the two tenors sang "The Pearl Fishers' Duet" which would be the first aria they had ever sung together. On 25 and 26 November he starred alongside soprano Verónica Villarroel in an opera in concert of Mascagni's Cavalleria rusticana at the "Municipal Auditorium" in San Antonio, Texas. He later held a concert at "Atrio de la Catedral" in Campeche, Mexico, on 28 November, where he sang songs from Incanto as well as some of his Spanish hits, including Bésame Mucho, Somos Novios, Amapola and Por ti Volare – the Spanish version of Con te Partiro.

2009: My Christmas, first holiday album
On 27 May 2009, Bocelli sang "Il Gladiatore", from the Gladiator soundtrack, followed by the UEFA Champions League Anthem, which is based on G.F. Handel's "Zadok the Priest", during the opening ceremony of the 2009 UEFA Champions League Final, in the Stadio Olimpico, in Rome.

On 3 November, My Christmas, his first Holiday album, produced by David Foster, was released and went on to become the best-selling Holiday album of the year.

The Andrea Bocelli & David Foster Christmas Special, the PBS special of the album, first aired on Thanksgiving night in the United States, and continued to be broadcast in the United States and Canada throughout the month of December. In late November, the program was broadcast in Mexico and in the UK; it later aired, 15 and 25 December, on Italia 1, in Italy, 19 December, on TVE2 and TROS, in Spain and the Netherlands, and Christmas Eve, on vtm and RTL-TVI, in Belgium and Luxembourg.

On 3 November, during the World Premiere of Disney's A Christmas Carol, in Leicester Square, London, following the switching on of the annual Oxford Street and Regent Street Christmas lights, Bocelli led the St Paul's Cathedral Choir, and more than 14,000 people across the capital, as they broke the Official Guinness World Record for the biggest ever Christmas carol sing-along, singing "Silent Night". He completed his performance in Leicester Square with, "God Bless Us Everyone", the closing song of the movie, which he provided the vocals for in English, Italian and Spanish. He returned to the United Kingdom, 16 December, for an appearance on The One Show, broadcast live by BBC One, and on The Alan Titchmarsh Show which aired 18 December, on ITV1.

On 21 November, a segment of Leute Heute, a German tabloid-program on ZDF, was about My Christmas and Bocelli's meeting in Rome with Pope Benedict XVI and 250 other artists, an event which was broadcast live earlier that day in Italy, by Rai Uno. Bocelli was also joined by the Piccolo Coro dell'Antoniano, in his home in Forte dei Marmi, where they sang "Caro Gesù Bambino", a song from My Christmas which was originally recorded by the choir in 1960. Rai Uno also broadcast the performance later that day, during the Zecchino d'Oro Festival. The following day, Bocelli was among Fabio Fazio's guests, on his popular Italian talk-show, Che tempo che fa, broadcast on Rai Tre. During the program Bocelli talked about his album and performed "The Lord's Prayer", "White Christmas", and "Silent Night". It was also announced that Bocelli would return to the show on 20 December and give a live concert of My Christmas. Bocelli also took part in the annual 2009 José Carreras Gala, on 17 December, where he sang Adeste Fideles, before singing "White Christmas" with José Carreras for the very first time; this was broadcast live, by Das Erste, in Germany. He then returning to Italy, for a concert in the Upper Basilica of San Francesco d'Assisi, on 19 December, which was broadcast directly after the Urbi et Orbi blessing of Pope Benedict XVI, 25 December, on Rai Uno.

In North America, Bocelli gave 6 concerts. On 28 November, he performed in the BankAtlantic Center, in Ft. Lauderdale, Florida. He later performed in the Air Canada Centre, in Toronto, Ontario, Canada, in the Izod Center, in East Rutherford, New Jersey, in the William Saroyan Theatre, in Fresno, California (changed from the much larger Save Mart Center due to scheduling conflicts), in the MGM Grand, in Las Vegas, and finally in the Honda Center, in Anaheim, California, on 3, 5, 8, 12 and 13 December. His last three arena concerts alone grossed a total of over 5,6 million dollars, placing him third on Billboard Magazine's week's Hot Tours ranking, behind the Trans-Siberian Orchestra and Il Divo, who both held over 5 times more concerts worldwide, compared to Bocelli's three in the United States, explaining their better showings.

In the United States, Bocelli made a number of high-profile TV appearances. He first performed "White Christmas" at the 83rd annual Macy's Thanksgiving Day Parade, broadcast live on NBC, 26 November. He performed the song again on 30 November during The Today Show also live. His appearance on The Oprah Winfrey Show during her Holiday Music Extravaganza, where he sang "What Child Is This", with Mary J. Blige, and later closed the show with Adeste Fideles, was also aired the same day, and was later rebroadcast on 23 December. Bocelli also sang "Adeste Fideles" and was interviewed by Barbara Walters and Joy Behar on The View, which aired 2 December, on ABC. On 8 December, he performed "Jingle Bells" with The Muppets on The Jay Leno Show. He also performed a number of songs from the album, including "The Christmas Song" with Natalie Cole, during a dinner at David Foster's mansion in Malibu, which was featured on The Dr. Phil Show, on 10 December. Bocelli also performed "White Christmas" and  "Silent Night", on the Larry King Live and Fox & Friends holiday-specials, broadcast 23 December, on CNN, and 19, 24 and 25 December, on Fox News.

In Brasil, following the success of the South American leg of the Incanto tour, where over 100,000 people attended his free concert at the São Paulo's "Parque Indipendencia", earlier in the year, it was announced that Bocelli would hold another Open-Air, entrance free, concert in Florianópolis, on 28 December, where a crowd of about a million people was expected to attend. However, due to financial and political reasons, the concert was later canceled on short notice, along with all the other events scheduled for Christmas in the city.

2010: Hollywood Walk of Fame and FIFA World Cup

On 31 January 2010, during the 52nd Grammy Awards, Bocelli, Mary J. Blige and David Foster joined forces again, singing "Bridge over Troubled Water" as a tribute to the victims of that year's earthquake in Haiti.

On 2 March, he was honoured with a star on the Hollywood Walk of Fame for his contribution to Live Theater, at 7000 Hollywood Boulevard, in front of the Roosevelt Hotel. The previous day, Bocelli, along with David Foster, were honored by L.A. Italia Film, Fashion and Art Fest during a ceremony at the Grauman's Chinese Theatre, in Hollywood, where The Story Behind The Voice, a documentary about Bocelli's life and career was shown.

On 12 March, Bocelli made an appearance on Skavlan, in Oslo, Norway, to promote his upcoming Scandinavian tour, giving a rare interview to the show's host Fredrik Skavlan, and later performing "Voglio Vivere Cosi", from his 2008 album Incanto, with Norwegian Boys' choir, Sølvguttene.

In April, he returned to Scandinavia for a concert in Telenor Arena in Bærum, Norway, on 8 April, a concert in Forum Copenhagen in Copenhagen, Denmark, on 9 April, and finally a concert in the Ericsson Globe, in Stockholm, Sweden, on 11 April. He was joined by Heather Headley and 120 musicians from the Stockholm Concert Orchestra, in all three concerts, and by Swedish mezzo-soprano Malena Ernman in his Swedish concert.

On 30 April, Bocelli sang "Nessun dorma" during the opening ceremony of the Expo 2010, in Shanghai, China. The following day, on 1 May, he held a concert, titled Charming China, at Shanghai Stadium. The concert was later broadcast by Shanghai TV, and by CCTV Channels throughout mainland China.

The two appearances coincided with Bocelli's Asian tour, consisting of a concert in Budokan, Tokyo, Japan, on 28 April, a concert in Jamsil Gymnasium, Seoul, South Korea, on 2 May, a concert in Hong Kong Convention and Exhibition Centre, in Hong Kong, on 4 May, a concert in Taipei Arena, Taipei, Taiwan, on 6 May, and finally a free concert, organized by the YTL Corporation, at the Singapore Botanic Gardens, in Singapore, on 8 May, attended by over 12,000 people, picked via public ballot. The concert was later broadcast, in its entirety, by Channel NewsAsia, on 28 and 29 May, and by Okto, on 30 May, in Singapore. An orchid in the Botanic Gardens' National Orchid Garden was also named after Bocelli in response to the concert. Australian pop singer Delta Goodrem performed again with Bocelli in all five concerts, after supporting him in his United States My Christmas 2009 winter tour.

On 18 May, during the 2010 World Music Awards, Bocelli performed "Un Amore Cosi Grande" from his 2008 album, Incanto, and received his seventh World Music Award, for "Best Classical Artist".

On 5 July, Bocelli gave a concert at the opening of the Khan Shatyr Entertainment Center, in Astana, on the occasion of Kazakhstan's president Nursultan Nazarbayev's 70th birthday.

On 9 July, Bocelli headlined the "Celebrate Africa: The Grand Finale" Concert at the Coca-Cola Dome, in Johannesburg, South Africa, to mark the end of the World Cup, two days before the final.

On 13 July, Montenegrin Statehood Day, Bocelli gave a concert at the seaside resort of Sveti Stefan, in western Montenegro, to mark the Golden Jubilee of the Sveti Stefan Hotel.

On 14 July, Bocelli gave a concert at the European Parliament's Espace Léopold, in Brussels, Belgium, during "Rome in the heart of the future", an event hosted by the Vice President of the European Parliament for the seventh parliament, MEP, Roberta Angelilli. A screening of the film Homage to Rome, directed by Franco Zeffirelli, who was present during the event, and starring Bocelli, in his cinematographic debut, was shown prior to the special concert.

On 25 July, Bocelli held the fifth and final edition of the Teatro del Silenzio, in his hometown of Lajatico, Tuscany. Bocelli's guests included Spanish Catalan tenor José Carreras, and Italian rock singer Zucchero. Sculptures by Swiss artist Kurt Laurenz Metzler, who attended the concert, were exhibited during this year's edition. Bocelli was also awarded the Pisano Doc, during the dress rehearsal for the concert, on 24 July, and received the 2010 Premio Lunezia nel mondo, during a private ceremony held on 21 July, for "the musical-literary quality of his songs."

In September 2010, Bocelli held a concert at the Odeon of Herodes Atticus, in Athens, Greece. All proceeds were donated to help cure cancer. Bocelli also gave concerts in Cairo, Egypt, in front of the pyramids and the Great Sphinx of Giza, as well as a fundraising concert inside the Duomo di Milano to benefit victims of the 2010 Haiti earthquake.

As part of the 2010 leg of the My Christmas Tour, Bocelli gave two concerts in The O2 Arena, in London, and the Manchester Arena, in Manchester, and a concert at The O2, in Dublin, in late November 2010. His sold-out concert at the O2 in London, was the most attended show in the venue's history, with 16,500 people attending the event. In early December, Bocelli gave 6 concerts in the United States. He performed in Madison Square Garden, in New York City, Prudential Center, in Newark, New Jersey, TD Garden, in Boston, Toyota Center, in Houston, Staples Center, in Los Angeles, and the MGM Grand's Garden Arena, in the Las Vegas Strip.

Bocelli also took part in the Christmas in Washington special on 12 December. On 19 December, Bocelli gave a concert, conducted by Claudio Scimone, in the Italian Senate.

2011: Metropolitan Opera recital, and Central Park Concert
In January, Bocelli gave three concerts in Germany. The concerts in Munich, Berlin, and Hamburg were all part of the Notte Illuminata Tour, launched in Pisa, at the Teatro Verdi, December 2010. In February, Bocelli performed a recital on the stage of the Metropolitan Opera house as part of the tour.

In late March, early April, as part of the 2011 Latin Leg of his Incanto Tour, Bocelli gave concerts in Bogotá, and Panama City.

In May 2011, Bocelli held 5 concerts in East and Southeast Asia, and was joined by New Zealand soprano Hayley Westenra during the tour. He first gave a concert in Jakarta, Indonesia. Bocelli held two other concerts in Taipei, and two concerts in Beijing.

In June and July, Bocelli gave two open-air concerts at historic sites, the first at Masada, in Israel, with all proceeds dedicated to support the residents of the Israeli regions of Galilee and Negev, and the second at Syracuse's ancient Greek theatre, in Sicily, with all proceeds donated to the Fiamme di Solidarietà (Flames of Solidarity) organization, to raise awareness of issues concerning the poorest and most marginalized in Italy.

Bocelli gave a free concert on 15 September, on the Great Lawn of Central Park in New York City. He was accompanied by the New York Philharmonic, conducted by its music director Alan Gilbert, and the Westminster Symphonic Choir. The concert was broadcast throughout the United States and Canada, by PBS, and in Italy, by Rai 1. Concerto: One Night in Central Park, the live album and the DVD were released 15 November.

On 25 September, Bocelli led Songs of Praise 50th anniversary celebration, alongside LeAnn Rimes and Katherine Jenkins.

On 15 October, Bocelli performed again for Pope Benedict XVI and a crowd of 8,000 people in Vatican's Audience Hall.

On 7 November, he gave an open-air free concert at Praça Rui Barbosa in Belo Horizonte, Brazil, to an audience of between 80,000 and 150,000 people.

On 17 November, he performed at the Children in Need Rocks Manchester concert, gaining critical acclaim for receiving a standing ovation from a crowd of pop and indie music fans.

2012–2014: Roméo et Juliette and Passione

Bocelli played the role of Romeo in Charles Gounod's opera Roméo et Juliette, at the Teatro Carlo Felice, for two performances in February 2012. He cancelled a third performance because of pharyngitis after having vocal strain throughout.

On 22 April, Bocelli gave an open-air concert at Yerevan's Liberty Square, in Armenia, dedicated to the proclamation of Yerevan as the 2012 World Book Capital; he was accompanied by the Armenian Philharmonic Orchestra conducted by Marcello Rota. On 19 November, he performed for Queen Elizabeth II and Prince Philip, Duke of Edinburgh, at the Royal Albert Hall, during the 100th anniversary of the Royal Variety Performance.

A new studio album titled Passione, featuring duets with Jennifer Lopez and Nelly Furtado, was released on 29 January 2013. On 7 February, Bocelli was an honorary guest at the 61st Annual National Prayer Breakfast, held at the Washington Hilton, where he performed "Ombra mai fu" and Franz Schubert's "Ave Maria" in the presence of President Barack Obama, First Lady Michelle Obama, Vice President Joe Biden, as well as other political leaders. On 20 February, he performed at the concert in Moscow Kremlin dedicated to 20th anniversary of Gazprom.

On 1 June, Bocelli performed with Plácido Domingo at the Arena di Verona, celebrating the 100th anniversary of the opera festival.

2015–present: Cinema, collaborations, and Sì

Bocelli released his fifteenth studio album Cinema on 23 October 2015. It contains renditions of classic film soundtracks and scores, featuring duets with Ariana Grande, Nicole Scherzinger and his wife Veronica Berti. The album received a nomination for Best Traditional Pop Vocal Album at the 59th Annual Grammy Awards; the Spanish-language version was nominated for Album of the Year at the 17th Annual Latin Grammy Awards.

On 7 May 2016, Bocelli performed at the King Power Stadium before Leicester City's final match of the 2015–16 Premier League against Everton, as part of the club's title celebrations.

On 15 December 2017, Ed Sheeran released a collaboration with Bocelli titled "Perfect Symphony". The song is a duet version of Sheeran's song "Perfect", with many of the original English lyrics sung in Italian.

In June 2018, Bocelli released the single "If Only", his first after fourteen years.
On 20 September 2018, Bocelli released the single "Fall On Me" which features vocals from his son Matteo. The two performed the song on 22 October episode of Dancing With the Stars. An English version of the song was released in October and was featured in the Walt Disney Pictures film The Nutcracker and the Four Realms as the end credit song. Both songs appear on Bocelli's album Sì, released on 26 October 2018.

On 12 October 2018, at the request of his close friend Sarah, Duchess of York, Bocelli performed two songs at the royal wedding of her daughter Princess Eugenie, the Bach/Gounod Ave Maria, and Panis angelicus by César Franck.

On 1 February 2019, Bocelli performed a sold-out concert in 'Winter at Tantora' festival running at Al-'Ula for the first time in Saudi Arabia.

On 3 July 2019 Bocelli performed at the opening ceremony of the 2019 Summer Universiade in Naples with three songs includes "Fall On Me" with his son Matteo.

On 12 April 2020, during the national COVID-19 lockdowns in Italy, Bocelli performed an Easter Sunday concert from an empty Milan Cathedral, accompanied by cathedral organist Emanuele Vianelli. The performance, titled "Music For Hope - Live From Duomo di Milano", was streamed live over YouTube, where it continues to be available for replay. About 5 million people tuned in for the livestream performance and, by 13 April 2020, over 32 million views were logged on the archived video.

On 13 September 2020, Bocelli performed the Italian National Anthem at the 2020 Tuscan Grand Prix.

November 2020, Bocelli released an album, Believe.  It was in response to the COVID-19 pandemic and featured recent pandemic related songs.

He performed Puccini's "Nessun Dorma" during the Opening Ceremony of the 2020 UEFA European Football Championship held in Rome, Italy on 11 June 2021.

On 5 June 2022 Bocelli performed Puccini's "Nessun Dorma" during the BBC's Platinum Party at the Palace one of the celebrations of the Platinum Jubilee of Elizabeth II.

On 21 October 2022, Bocelli released his first collaboration album with his son and daughter, Matteo and Virginia, titled A Family Christmas.

Voice
Bocelli is a widely popular singer with a substantial fan base worldwide. However, he is also a polarizing figure in classical music, whose voice and performances
have routinely been the subject of negative reviews by critics. Italian spinto tenor Franco Corelli praised Bocelli's voice after hearing it for the first time during a master class in 1986, in Turin, and he later gave Bocelli private lessons.

Puerto Rican soprano Ana María Martínez, who regularly performs with Bocelli, said, "More than anything, Andrea has something that is unique in that he brings this light that is always around him. And this purity of heart and beauty of sound just touches the listener. It can't be described."

Celine Dion said while introducing him during her Christmas Special for These Are Special Times, in 1998, that "if God would have a singing voice, he must sound a lot like Andrea Bocelli," and David Foster, a producer of the album, often describes Bocelli's voice as the most beautiful in the world. Similarly, jazz singer Al Jarreau, who performed with Bocelli on the "Night of the Proms" tour in Europe in 1995, described him as "the most beautiful voice in the world," and American talk show host Oprah Winfrey commented on her talk show that, "when I hear Andrea sing, I burst into tears." After attending Bocelli's concert at the Hollywood Bowl in 2009, British-American actress Elizabeth Taylor said, "My mind, my soul were transported by his beauty, his voice, his inner being. God has kissed this man and I thank God for it." Taylor had been a passionate fan of Bocelli's since the beginning of his music career in the mid-1990s. Other fans include Albert II, Prince of Monaco, who invited the tenor to sing at his wedding, as well as Sarah, Duchess of York, and actress Isabella Rossellini.

Bocelli's voice, more specifically his interpretation of opera, has been regularly criticized by classical music critics. These include Bernard Holland of The New York Times and Andrew Clements of The Guardian. In 1999, The New York Times chief music critic Anthony Tommasini in his review of Bocelli's North American opera debut at the Detroit Opera House in the title role of Massenet's Werther commented, "The basic colour of Mr. Bocelli's voice is warm and pleasant, but he lacks the technique to support and project his sound. His sustained notes wobble. His soft high notes are painfully weak. Inadequate breath control often forces him to clip off notes prematurely at the end of phrases." In December 2000, Tommasini again criticised Bocelli, this time for his La bohème album when he stated that Bocelli "still has trouble with basic things, like breath support" and his voice had been "carefully recorded ... to help it match the trained voices of the other cast members in fullness and presence."

In describing Bocelli's singing, The New York Times music critic Bernard Holland noted, "the tone is rasping, thin and, in general, poorly supported. Even the most modest upward movement thins it even more, signalling what appears to be the onset of strangulation. To his credit, Mr Bocelli sings mostly in tune. But his phrasing tends toward carelessness and rhythmic jumble... The diction is not clear." Furthermore, Holland observed that "The critic's duty is to report that Mr Bocelli is not a very good singer." The Associated Press reported "Passion? Yes. Power. No. Bocelli's voice – though robust in spirit and precisely in tune, even in the upper register – had a thin quality that never opened up." Similarly, classical music critic Andrew Clements found Bocelli's studio opera recordings consistently disappointing in quality: "Bocelli's profoundly unmusical contribution, with its unvaryingly coarse tone, wayward intonation and never a phrase properly shaped, fatally undermines all their contributions." Anne Midgette of The New York Times agreed, noting "a thinness of voice, oddly anemic phrasing (including shortchanging upper notes of phrases in a most untenorial manner), a curious lack of expression."

During a 2009 performance in New York, the music critic Steve Smith wrote "For cognoscenti of vocal artistry the risks involved in Mr. Bocelli's undertakings, both then and now, need no explanation. Substantial technical shortcomings masked by amplification are laid bare in a more conventional classical setting. Mr. Bocelli's tone can be pleasant, and his pitch is generally secure. But his voice is small and not well supported; his phrasing, wayward and oddly inexpressive."

In 2010, Joe Banno of The Washington Post gave an unfavorable review of Bocelli's Carmen recording, describing the oft-noted failings in Bocelli's vocal resources on full display in this performance: "Bocelli, to be fair, possesses an essentially lovely tenor and knows his stuff when it comes to selling a pop ballad. And Decca's close miking of his puny voice inflates his sound to near-Franco Corelli-like dimensions. But his short-breathed, clumsily phrased, interpretively blank and often pinched and strained singing makes his Don Jose a tough listen."

Recognition

Honors
 Grand Officer of the Order of Merit of the Italian Republic (Grande Ufficiale Ordine al Merito della Repubblica Italiana) awarded in Rome, on 4 March 2006.
 Grand Officer of the Order of Merit of Duarte, Sánchez and Mella by the President of the Dominican Republic, Leonel Fernández in 2009, for his contributions to International art and culture.
 Star on the Hollywood Walk of Fame, for his contribution to live theater, at 7000 Hollywood Boulevard, in 2010.
 Gold medal for Merit by the president of Serbia Aleksandar Vučić in 2022.

Selected awards

 Winner of the 1994 Newcomers section of the Sanremo Music Festival.
 ECHO music award for "Best Single of the Year" for "Time to Say Goodbye", in 1997.
 ECHO Klassik "Best seller of the year" award for his album, Viaggio Italiano in 1997.
 Bambi Award in 1997.
 Two World Music Awards, one in the category "Best Italian Singer", and one for "Best Classical Interpretation" in 1998.
 ECHO Klassik, for "Best selling classical album" with Aria: The Opera Album in 1998.
 ECHO Klassik for "Bestseller of the year" for Sacred Arias in 2000.
 Two 2000 Classical BRIT Awards for "Best selling classical album" and "Album of the year" for Sacred Arias in 2000.
 Goldene Europa for classical music in 2000.
 Goldene Kamera award in the "Music & Entertainment" category 2002.
 Two World Music Awards, for "World best selling classical artist" and for "Best selling Italian artist" in 2002.
  Telegatto award for the soundtrack of the series Cuore in 2002.
 2002 Classical BRIT Award for "Outstanding Contribution to Music" in 2002.
 Two 2003 Classical BRIT Awards for "Best selling classical album" and "Album of the year" for Sentimento in 2003.
 Two World Music Awards for "Best Italian Artist" and "World's Best-selling Classical Artist" in 2006.
  Telegatto award in platinum for Italian music in the world in 2008.
 World Music Awards for "World's Best-selling Classical Artist" in 2010.
 "America Award" of the Italy–USA Foundation in 2012.
 "International Artist of the Year in association with Raymond Weil" of the Classic Brit Awards 2012.
 The Billboard Latin Music Lifetime Achievement Award in 2014.
 "Art, Science and Peace Prize" 2015 from PIER FRANCO MARCENARO founder of "Man Center" and "School of Spirituality" for Andrea Bocelli art which elevates the spirit.

Personal life

Bocelli met his first wife, Enrica Cenzatti, while singing at piano bars early in his career. They were married on 27 June 1992. Their first child, son Amos, was born 22 February 1995. Their second son, Matteo, was born on 8 October 1997. The couple separated in 2002. 

Bocelli lives with his second wife and manager, Veronica Berti. They met in 2002. In September 2011, the couple announced that Berti was expecting her first and Bocelli's third child, a daughter, in the spring. His daughter Virginia was born 21 March 2012.

Bocelli married Veronica Berti on 21 March 2014 at the Sanctuary of Montenero in the coastal town of Livorno, Italy. The couple live in Forte dei Marmi on the Mediterranean. Bocelli's first wife and two sons live in the couple's previous residence in the same comune, in Versilia. 

On 30 April 2000, Bocelli's father, Alessandro Bocelli, died. His mother encouraged him to honor his commitments, and so he sang for Pope John Paul II, in Rome, on 1 May, and immediately returned home for the funeral. At his 5 July performance, filmed for PBS as American Dream—Andrea Bocelli's Statue of Liberty Concert, Bocelli dedicated the encore Sogno (Dream), from his 1999 album Sogno, to the memory of his father.

On 12 November 2022, Andrea, Matteo and Virginia (aged 10) sang together at The Royal Albert Hall at the UK Festival of Remembrance.

Bocelli has enjoyed horseback riding for much of his life.

A section of the beach in Jesolo, on the Italian Adriatic coast, was named after Bocelli on 11 August 2003.

In October 2013 Bocelli bought a second home in North Miami Beach.

Bocelli is a self-declared fan of Italian football club Inter Milan. In an interview in Pisa, he told a group of Inter fans that "My passion for Inter started during my college years, when Inter was winning everything in Italy and the world. When Inter won the Champions League in 2010, I was with my friends and I was listening to the game on the radio, and everything was a little bit in advance so I was celebrating before them. That night I was also brought to tears of joy. The treble is a feeling no one in Italy will be able to equal".

Teatro del Silenzio

In 2006, Bocelli convinced the municipality of his hometown Lajatico to build an outdoor theatre, the "Teatro del Silenzio". He serves as its honorary president and performs for one night only, every July; the rest of the year, the theatre doesn't operate.

Since its opening in 2006, Bocelli has held 12 concerts, every July, with guests including Plácido Domingo, José Carreras, Sarah Brightman, Katherine Jenkins, Zucchero, Laura Pausini, and Elisa. Bocelli's guests have also included instrumentalists Lang Lang, Chris Botti, and Kenny G. The 2007 concert was released on CD and DVD in 2008.

Discography

Studio albums
 Il Mare Calmo della Sera (1994)
 Bocelli (1995)
 Viaggio Italiano (1996/1997)
 Aria: The Opera Album (1998)
 Sogno (1999)
 Sacred Arias (1999)
 Verdi (2000)
 Cieli di Toscana (2001)
 Sentimento (2002)
 Andrea (2004)
 Amore (2006)
 Incanto (2008)
 My Christmas (2009)
 Passione (2013)
 Cinema (2015)
 Sì (2018)
 Believe (2020)

Collaborative albums
 A Hymn for the World (1997)
 A Hymn for the World 2: Voices from Heaven (1998)
 Verdi's Requiem (2000)
 Carmen: Duets & Arias (2010)
 A Family Christmas (2022)

Bibliography
Bocelli is the author, and co-author, of numerous works available in Italian, English, and other languages. Some books are available in Braille and others in large print. The list below is limited to his English language books which are widely available.

  Braille edition, ISBN not available.
  Large print edition.

See also
 Italian estimated best-selling music artists

References

External links

 
 
 
 

 
1958 births
20th-century Italian male singers
21st-century Italian male singers
Blind classical musicians
Italian blind people
Brit Award winners
Converts to Roman Catholicism from atheism or agnosticism
Crooners
Decca Records artists
English-language singers from Italy
French-language singers of Italy
German-language singers of Italy
Spanish-language singers of Italy
Portuguese-language singers of Italy
Italian keyboardists
Italian male pianists
Italian male singers
Italian multi-instrumentalists
Italian tenors
Italian philanthropists
Italian pop singers
Italian Roman Catholics
Italian songwriters
Latin-language singers
Living people
Musicians from Tuscany
Opera crossover singers
Order of Merit of Duarte, Sánchez and Mella
People from Pisa
Sanremo Music Festival winners of the newcomers section
Traditional pop music singers
Universal Music Group artists
University of Pisa alumni
World Music Awards winners
Grand Officers of the Order of Merit of the Italian Republic